João Paulo Pereira Mendes Bersch or simply João Paulo (born November 17, 1984 in Curitiba), is a Brazilian central defender who currently plays for Paysandu Sport Club.

Contract
Paraná: 1 February 2007 to 31 January 2010
Figueirense: 6 May 2011 to 31 December 2012

External links
sambafoot
CBF
placar

1984 births
Living people
Brazilian footballers
Club Athletico Paranaense players
Paraná Clube players
Goiás Esporte Clube players
Figueirense FC players
Joinville Esporte Clube players
Paysandu Sport Club players
Campeonato Brasileiro Série A players
Brazilian people of German descent
Association football defenders
Footballers from Curitiba